The "Five Eyes" Air Force Interoperability Council (AFIC) assigns codenames for fighters and other military aircraft originating in, or operated by, the air forces of the former Warsaw Pact, including Russia and the People's Republic of China. While the AFIC names designations are sometimes known as "NATO reporting names" and similar names, Five Eyes is an intelligence alliance between the United States, United Kingdom, Canada and two non-NATO countries, Australia and New Zealand.

See also 
 NATO reporting name

Notes

fighters
NATO reporting names for fighters, List of